Chris Cochrane (born 18 December 1988) is an Irish former professional rugby union player, who played wing for Ulster Rugby from 2008 to 2014.

He was educated at Coleraine Academical Institution, leaving in 2007. He was selected in the Ireland squad for the 2008 IRB Junior World Championship. While in the Ulster Rugby academy, he made his first appearance for the senior provincial side in a friendly against Bath in 2008, and his competitive debut, scoring a try, against Leinster in 2011. He was awarded a development contract with Ulster ahead of the 2012–13 season. He retired prior to the 2014–15 season.

References

Irish rugby union players
Ulster Rugby players
1988 births
Living people
Dungannon RFC players
Rugby union wings
Rugby union players from County Antrim